Bazangan (also Romanized as Bazangān and Bezangān; also known as Bezamgān) is a village in Golbibi Rural District, Marzdaran District, Sarakhs County, Razavi Khorasan Province, Iran. At the 2006 census, its population was 3,697, in 915 families.

population 
According to the 2006 census, its population is 3697 people (915 families).

Location 
This village is located 90 km southwest of Sarakhs and on the eastern slope of Bazangan mountain which is one of the functions of Sarakhs city and is located 128 km east of Mashhad in a mountainous area. Bazangan mountain is located 4 km south of Qara Dagh mountain and 6 km west and southwest of the village. Its climate is temperate and dry. the historical castle of Bazangan is located In this village.

The origin of the Mervi family is related to their main birthplace, the city of Mervi, which is now part of Turkmenistan. This city was once part of the territory of Iran when it was separated from Iran during the Qajar rule.

Sights and historical areas 

 Bazangan Castle

 Bazangan Lake
 Bazangan Cave
 Karkass Cave
 Spring mill
 Mulberry trees at the entrance of the village

References 

Populated places in Sarakhs County